Loughborough College is a general further education college located in Leicestershire, England that offers a range of courses including further education, higher education, apprenticeships and professional qualifications.

List of principals 
The past principals of Loughborough College:

 Charles Laws (1909-1915)
 Herbert Schofield (1915-1950)
 Major-General W.F. Hasted (1951-1952)
 G.J.D. Schumach (1952-1953)
 Dan Lysaght (1953-1960)
 Dr. Fred Lester (1961-1975)
 Donald Hutchings (1976-1988)
 Harold Wilkinson (1988-1993)
 Jim Mutton (1993-2012)
 Esme Winch (2012-2015)
 Heather MacDonald (2015–2017)
 Colin Butler (acting principal 2017 and 2020)
 John Doherty (2017-2020)
 Jo Maher (2020–present; Principal and Chief Executive)

The college today

Further education courses

Loughborough College offers further education courses across a number of different subject areas, including beauty, business, childcare, creative industries & computing, electrical installation, engineering, hairdressing, hospitality & catering, leisure, travel & aviation, motor vehicles, music, performing arts, public services and sport. Loughborough College also partners with the National Space Academy to deliver a unique Space Engineering program.

The College offers students work experience as part of their course. Students also have the option to gain experience with established local companies through the College's links with external organizations. Courses are aimed at young adults and mature students alike.

Apprenticeships
Loughborough College have a range of apprenticeships at intermediate, advanced and higher levels.  These courses are recommended for students who wish to gain practical skills in a working environment whilst earning a wage.

Professional qualifications
Many of the courses are offered in association with professional bodies including the Association of Accountant Technicians (AAT), Chartered Institute of Marketing (CIM) and the Institute of Leadership and Management (ILM). By 2019 ,the college had received over 30 commendations from the CIM.

Facilities

Accommodation

Halls of Residence 
Halls include a total of 170 single bedrooms in a purpose-built complex (including a block specifically designed for under 18).

Living in Homestay 
Homestay is offered to students who want to live with a family in Loughborough.

Elite Athlete Performance Centre 
The EAPC is a restored listed building that provides a total of 17 en-suite rooms for students under the age of 18.

Radmoor Centre 
The Radmoor Centre is a sports facility that also has a hair and beauty salon, a restaurant and bar.

Radmoor Day Nursery 
The Radmoor Day Nursery offers an on-campus daycare facility for children up to school age.

The Hub 
Construction of a new central student facility (The Hub) was completed in September 2014.

T Level Centre 
Due to open in September 2022, the T Level Centre building will provide flexible teaching spaces for a new line of T Level qualifications.

Notable alumni 

 Thomas Young – T38 100m Sprinter
 Harry Aikines-Aryeetey – athletics
 Andrew Barnard – cricket
 Harvey Barnes – football
 Jude Bellingham – football
 Mason Bennett – football
 Katie Boulter – tennis
 Sophie Bradley – football
 Rachel Bragg – volleyball
 Karen Carney – football
 Ben Chilwell – football
 Elise Christie – short track skating
 Libby Clegg – athletics
 James Dasaolu – athletics
 Toni Duggan – football
 Harry Ellis – rugby union
 Daniel Fogg – swimming
 Carl Froch – boxing
 Phil Gilchrist – football 
 Robbie Grabarz – athletics
 Sophie Hahn – athletics
 Lucy Hall – triathlon
 Fran Halsall – swimming
 Jeff Hendrick – football
 Steph Houghton – football
 Tom Huddlestone – football
 Sam Ingram – judo
 Andy King – football
 Charlie Matthews – rugby union
 Melanie Nocher – swimming
 Roberto Pavoni – swimming
 Leon Rattigan – wrestling
 Jemma Reekie – middle-distance runner. Voted Athletics Weekly 'Women's British Athlete of the Year 2020'
 Joe Roebuck – swimming
 Tom Rogic – football
 Martyn Rooney – athletics
 Jeffrey Schlupp – football
 Sarah Stevenson – taekwondo
 Bradly Sinden – taekwondo
 Liam Tancock – swimming
 Sophie Thornhill - paracycling
 Nicola White – hockey

See also
Loughborough
Loughborough University
Loughborough Students' Union

References

External links
Loughborough College website
Loughborough Students' Union website

Higher education colleges in England
Further education colleges in Leicestershire
Educational institutions established in 1909
1909 establishments in England